The 2019 World Mixed Curling Championship was held from 12 to 19 October in Aberdeen, Scotland.

In the final, Canada's Colin Kurz defeated Germany's Andy Kapp 6-5. It was Canada's second consecutive title at the World Mixed, having won in 2018. It was also Germany's first spot on the podium, having never made it past the quarterfinals in past years.

Teams

Round robin standings
Final Round Robin Standings

Round robin results

Draw 1
12 October, 8:00 am

Draw 2
12 October, 12:00 pm

Draw 3
12 October, 4:00 pm

Draw 4
12 October, 8:30 pm

Draw 5
13 October, 8:00 am

Draw 6
13 October, 12:00 pm

Draw 7
13 October, 4:00 pm

Draw 8
13 October, 8:00 pm

Draw 9
14 October, 8:00 am

Draw 10
14 October, 12:00 pm

Draw 11
14 October, 4:00 pm

Draw 12
14 October, 8:00 pm

Draw 13
15 October, 8:00 am

Draw 14
15 October, 12:00 pm

Draw 15
15 October, 4:00 pm

Draw 16
15 October, 8:00 pm

Draw 17
16 October, 8:00 am

Draw 18
16 October, 12:00 pm

Draw 19
16 October, 4:00 pm

Draw 20
16 October, 8:00 pm

Draw 21
17 October, 8:00 am

Draw 22
17 October, 12:00 pm

Draw 23
17 October, 4:00 pm

Draw 24
17 October, 8:00 pm

Playoffs
Once group play has finished the top three teams from each group, as well as the best fourth place team, will proceed to a four round playoff. The playoff teams will be seeded based on their final ranking within their group as well as their Draw Shot Challenge score.

Round of 16
18 October, 9:00 am

18 October, 1:00 pm

Quarterfinals
18 October, 7:00 pm

Semifinals
19 October, 9:00 am

Bronze-medal game
19 October, 3:00 pm

Gold-medal game
19 October, 3:00 pm

References

External links

World Mixed Curling Championship
World Mixed Curling Championship
World Mixed Curling Championship
Sports competitions in Aberdeen
International curling competitions hosted by Scotland
World Mixed Curling Championship